Charles Boyle (born 1955 in Leeds) is a British poet and novelist. He also uses the pseudonyms Jack Robinson and Jennie Walker. As Walker, he won the 2008 McKitterick Prize for his novella 24 for 3.

In 2012, Boyle wrote a short piece for The Times Literary Supplement in which he good-naturedly referred to vandalism of this Wikipedia biography.

Biography
Boyle read English at Cambridge University, taught in a Sheffield comprehensive school and in Egypt and worked in publishing, including for several years at Faber and Faber.

In 1980 he married painter Madeleine Strindberg.

He is well known for his 2001 book of poems The Age of Cardboard and String, which had favourable reviews from The Guardian ("The voice is quite beguiling: completely unpretentious yet still resonant and lyrical; linguistically precise and emotionally evasive, often at the same time. We like that.") and Magma Poetry ("['My Alibi'] is an exquisite distillation of much of what Boyle has to say".

In 2007, as a result of his difficulty in getting 24 for 3 published, he established CB editions, a small press dedicated to novellas, translations, and writing in other genres often neglected by mainstream publishers.

Titles published by CB editions have won awards including the McKitterick Prize, the Scott Moncrieff Translation Prize, the Aldeburgh First Collection Prize, and the Republic of Consciousness Prize, as well as being shortlisted for the Goldsmiths Prize, the Guardian First Book Award, and Forward Prizes for Poetry.

Boyle's An Overcoat: Scenes from the Afterlife of H.B. (2016), written under the pseudonym "Jack Robinson", was featured in The Guardians "Nicholas Lezard's choice" column in April 2017, with Lezard concluding: "I can't think of a wittier, more engaging, stylistically audacious, attentive and generous writer working in the English language right now".

Awards
1981 Cholmondeley Award
1996 Forward Prize shortlist for Paleface
2001 T. S. Eliot Prize shortlist for The Age of Cardboard and String
2001 Whitbread Awards shortlist for The Age of Cardboard and String
2008 McKitterick Prize for 24 for 3 (as Jennie Walker)

Works

As Jennie Walker

As Jack Robinson

References

External links
 Boyle's Blog – Sonofabook
 CBe Editions
 Charles Boyle interviewed by James Tookey in 3:AM Magazine

1951 births
British poets
Living people
21st-century pseudonymous writers
British male poets